Volcán (Volcano) is the title of the studio album released by Mexican singer José José in 1978. The arranger and director of all the songs was the Spanish composer Rafael Pérez Botija. The main hits of the album were: O Tu O Yo, Volcán, Farolero, and Preguntaselo A Ella.

Track listing
 Volcán (Pérez Botija)
 O Tu O Yo (Honorio Herrero-Luis Gómez Escolar-Julio Seijas)
 Amor Lo Que Se Dice (Pérez Botija)
 Amandote (Manuel Soto)
 Preguntaselo A Ella (Pérez Botija)
 Solo Los Pajaros (Honorio Herrero-Luis Gómez Escolar-Julio Seijas)
 Jaque Mate (Manuel Soto)
 Por Una Sonrisa (Pérez Botija)
 Liberame (Lazaro Muñiz-Armando Martinez)
 Farolero (Pérez Botija)

Lyrics & Music: Rafael Pérez Botija (except as noted)
Arrangement: Rafael Pérez Botija

2,6 Jesús Glück

4,7,9 Alejandro Monroy

1978 albums
José José albums
Spanish-language albums